Toe Rag Studios is an analogue recording studio located in Hackney, London, England.

History
The studio was founded in 1991 by Liam Watson and Josh Collins in the Shoreditch area of London.  In 1997, the business relocated to Hackney due to rising overheads.  Although the studio didn't open exclusively in the analogue market, it was formed to eventually only use analogue equipment (despite the cost), as "there were loads of [cheap digital studios] opening up all the time and then closing down every week because they didn't really offer anything unique".

Facilities
Toe Rag offers clients music production using eight-track multitrack recording technology, and all recording media is magnetic tape.

Equipment
Recording is centred on an EMI REDD.17 mixing console (originally from Abbey Road Studios) and Studer A80 tape machine, as well as microphones by Neumann, Reslo and STC.  Monitoring is performed through Tannoy loudspeakers.  Vintage backline includes Vox and Fender amplifiers, and instruments include Farfisa and Hammond organs, as well as a 1965 Ludwig drum kit.

As well as hardware, the studio's live room was specially built to maximise the acoustic properties.  In addition to this, the studio makes use of echo chambers.

Notable clients

A-Bones
Action Swingers
Nic Armstrong
The Before & After
The Bishops
Billy Childish
Clocks
Hugh Cornwell
The Cribs
Colorama
Dan Sartain
The Datsuns
Didier Wampas & Bikini Machine
Dog Ugly
Electric Wizard
The Ettes
François Evans
The Flaming Stars
Galley Beggar
Holly Golightly
The Hugs
James Hunter
The Kaisers
The Kills
The Liberty Takers
Bobby Long
Madness
Metronomy
Pete Molinari
The Mystreated
Neils Children
Spitfire
Strip Kings
Supergrass
Tame Impala
Television Personalities
Temples
Toybloïd
Uncle Acid & the Deadbeats
The Undertones
Vibrosonic
The Wave Pictures
The White Stripes
Wolf Alice
The Wytches
The Zutons

References

External links
 Official website

Recording studios in London
Privately held companies of the United Kingdom